The Climate Change Authority (CCA) is an Australian Government statutory agency responsible for providing independent advice to government on climate change policy. It was established by and operates under the Climate Change Authority Act 2011. The Authority commenced operations on 1 July 2012. It was setup by Julia Gillard and has withstood concerted efforts for its disestablishment. The Abbott Government campaigned for the CCA's abolishment, having successfully abolished the Climate Commission.

The Authority is a non-corporate entity and has no legislative or executive powers, which remain with the Government and Parliament of the day. The Authority is currently tasked with undertaking periodic legislative reviews of the Emissions Reduction Fund and National Greenhouse and Energy Reporting scheme, and carrying out special reviews as requested either by the Minister responsible for climate change or by the Australian Parliament. It may also undertake self-initiated research on matters related to climate change.

Prior to amendments made by the Australian Parliament in 2014 and 2015, the Authority was required to review Australia's greenhouse gas emissions caps, any indicative national emissions trajectory and national carbon budget; progress in achieving Australia's emissions reduction targets and national carbon budget; and the Renewable Energy Target and (since repealed) emissions trading scheme. Members are entitled to and often write dissenting minority reports.

Membership
The Authority has a board comprising a chair and up to eight other permanent members. Current members are Grant King (chair), Susie Smith, Mark Lewis, John McGee and Dr Russell Reichelt AO. Australia's Chief Scientist, Dr Cathy Foley AO PSM serves as an ex officio Authority member. Dr Wendy Craik AM, former Commissioner of the Productivity Commission and Chief Executive of the Murray-Darling Basin Commission among other executive roles, was appointed Chair of the Authority on 1 May 2016 and served until 19 April 2021. The original Chair of the Authority, former Reserve Bank of Australia Governor and Federal Treasury Secretary, Bernie Fraser, resigned from the position in 2015.

Former members have included Clive Hamilton, Heather Ridout, Ian Chubb, Kate Carnell and John Quiggin.

Publications
The Authority has published a total of 23 reports since it was established in 2012. This includes reviews of:
the National Greenhouse and Energy Reporting legislation
the National Windfarm Commissioner
the Emissions Reduction Fund
the power sector (with the Australian Energy Market Commission) 
policies to meet Australia's emissions reduction targets under the Paris Agreement.

In 2013 a report investigating emissions targets concluded Australia's target was inadequate and not credible.  The CCA produced a key review in 2014.  It set out the targets Australia needed to follow to help limit global warming to less than 2° Celsius.  In 2016, the body released a report calling for the government of Australia to introduce an emissions trading scheme.

The Authority published three reports in 2020. The first report, Prospering in a low emissions world, sets out recommendations for how Australia can reduce its greenhouse gas emissions in order to meet its 2030 Nationally Determined Contribution under the Paris Agreement as well as subsequent, more ambitious targets, and prosper in a world transitioning to net zero emissions. The second report, Economic recovery, resilience and prosperity after the coronavirus, identifies measures previously proposed by the Authority that could contribute to a “triple-win” stimulus package in response to the economic impacts of the COVID-19 pandemic. The third report, a statutory review of the Emissions Reduction Fund, examines its performance and makes 23 recommendations aimed at increasing the Emissions Reduction Fund's contribution to reducing Australia's emissions, improving the operation of the scheme and enhancing governance arrangements and proactively managing risk, including climate risk.

See also

Climate change in Australia
Electricity sector in Australia
List of Australian Government entities
Renewable energy in Australia

References

External links

Climate change in Australia
Commonwealth Government agencies of Australia
Government agencies established in 2012
2012 establishments in Australia